The Mianzini mole-rat or Mianzini African mole-rat (Tachyoryctes annectens) is a species of rodent in the family Spalacidae endemic to Kenya.  Its natural habitats are dry savanna, pastureland, and rural gardens. Some taxonomic authorities consider it to be conspecific with the East African mole-rat.

References

Mammals of Kenya
Tachyoryctes
Endemic fauna of Kenya
Mammals described in 1891
Taxa named by Oldfield Thomas
Taxonomy articles created by Polbot
Taxobox binomials not recognized by IUCN